Sharon Fonn is a South African Professor of Public Health at the University of the Witwatersrand. Her work has focused on cervical cancer, health systems and developing African capacity for public health research.

Career and impact
Fonn served as the head of the University of the Witwatersrand School of Public Health from 2003 to 2011. She is a member of the Academy of Science of South Africa.
Professor Fonn helped to set up Africa's longest running study of children from birth She has published over 50 scientific articles.

Awards and honors
 honorary doctorate at Sahlgrenska Academy

References

External links
 

South African women scientists
South African scientists
Members of the Academy of Science of South Africa
Living people
South African public health doctors
University of the Witwatersrand alumni
Academic staff of the University of the Witwatersrand
1958 births
Women public health doctors